John Stabb (1865–1917)  of Torquay, Devon, England, was an ecclesiologist and antiquary of the county of Devon. He is best known for his three-volume publication Some Old Devon Churches, their Rood Screens, Pulpits, Fonts, etc. (1908, 1911, 1916), which he illustrated with several hundred of his own photographs.

Career
For many years he gave up a large portion of his time in visiting, photographing and collecting much useful and interesting information relating to Devon churches, a subject in which he was greatly interested, and left behind him a pictorial and historical record which "will ever be a monument of 
painstaking research". This record is his work entitled Some Old Devon Churches. The first volume appeared in 1908, with 126 plates from photographs taken by himself, of rood screens, pulpits, fonts, bench ends, monuments, bells, and the most noteworthy objects of interest existing in each of the churches described by him. The second volume, with 162 plates, appeared in 1911, and in 1916 the work was completed by the publication of vol. iii. with 112 plates, making a most interesting and valuable contribution to the literature of the subject, with 400 illustrations in all, and describing 264 of the churches of Devon.

A fervent churchman, Stabb was Treasurer of the Torquay Branch of the English Church Union, a member of the Guild of All Souls and of the C.B.S. He was also a member of the Devonshire Association and of the Devon and Exeter Architectural Society, to the publications of which Society he contributed several papers illustrated with photographs taken by himself. At one time he was on the Committee of the Torquay Natural History Society, from which he retired on account of ill health, and occasionally lectured to the same Society, his lectures being illustrated by his own photographs. Also he held several medals, 
conferred on him by various Societies for his photographic 
work.

Character
"Mr. Stabb was of a naturally quiet and retiring disposition 
and most generous to the poor and afflicted, irrespective 
of creed, by whom he will be greatly missed".

Death
He died at his residence Clanmarina, Torquay, on 2 August 1917, aged 52. He was buried in the Torquay Cemetery on 6 August 1917, a service at All Saints' Church, Babbacombe, preceding the funeral which was attended by numerous friends.

List of works
Some Old Devon Churches, Their Rood Screens, Pulpits, Fonts, Etc., 3 Vols., London: Vol 1, 1908, Index ; Vol.2, 1911; Vol.3, 1916.
 Devon Church antiquities: being a Description of Many Objects of Interest in the old Parish Churches of Devonshire. Vol 1. 1909.

Sources
Devon and Cornwall Notes and Queries, Vol.X, January 1918 - October 1919, pp. 18–19  (out of copyright text quoted)

References

1865 births
1917 deaths
19th-century antiquarians
20th-century Anglicans
20th-century antiquarians
20th-century English historians
Anglican scholars
British historians of religion
Ecclesiologists
English antiquarians
Historians of Christianity
Historians of Devon
Writers from Torquay